Tzimmes, or tsimmes, is a traditional Ashkenazi Jewish stew typically made from carrots and dried fruits such as prunes or raisins, often combined with other root vegetables (including yam).

Tzimmes is often part of the Rosh Hashanah meal, when it is traditional to eat sweet and honey-flavored dishes. Some cooks add chunks of meat (usually beef flank or brisket). The dish is cooked slowly over low heat and flavored with honey or sugar and sometimes cinnamon or other spices. 

The name is a Yiddish word that, according to the Oxford English Dictionary, may come from Middle High German word . "To make a big tzimmes over something" is a Yinglish expression that means to make a big fuss, perhaps because of the slicing, mixing, and stirring that go into the preparation of the dish.

See also
Jewish cuisine
Israeli cuisine
List of carrot dishes

References

Ashkenazi Jewish cuisine
Casserole dishes
Carrot dishes
Yiddish words and phrases